Operation Buffalo may refer to:

 Operation Buffalo, 1944 military operation, part of the Battle of Anzio in WW2 
 Operation Buffalo (1956), four open-air nuclear tests at Maralinga, South Australia
 Operation Buffalo (1967), a Vietnam War operation 
 Operation Buffalo (TV series), 2020 drama series based on the 1956 Operation Buffalo nuclear tests
 Operation Büffel (Buffalo), 1943 withdrawal of the German 9th Army